Stephanie Anne Amiel, Lady Alberti,  (born 17 October 1954) is a British physician and academic, specialising in type 1 diabetes. Since 1995, she has been the R. D. Lawrence Professor of Diabetic Medicine at King's College London and a consultant at King's College Hospital.

Early life and education
Amiel was born on 17 October 1954 in Farnborough, Kent, England. She was educated at Baston School for Girls, an all-girls private school in Kent. She studied at Guy's Hospital School of Medicine, graduating with a Bachelor of Science (BSc) degree in 1975 and Bachelor of Medicine, Bachelor of Surgery (MBBS) degrees in 1978. She later undertook research towards a Doctor of Medicine (MD) degree which she completed in 1988.

Academic career
From 1983 to 1986, Amiel was a research fellow at Yale University. At Yale she undertook research in diabetes under professors William V. Tamborlane and Robert Stanley Sherwin. She then returned to England, and was a research fellow and honorary senior registrar at St Bartholomew's Hospital in the City of London from 1986 to 1989. Between 1989 and 1995, she was a senior lecturer and honorary consultant at Guy's Hospital in the London Borough of Southwark. In May 1995, she joined King's College London as the R. D. Lawrence Professor of Diabetic Medicine. She is also a consultant physician to the diabetes services at King's College Hospital NHS Foundation Trust.

Amiel's research continues to be focused on type 1 diabetes. As a practising physician, she specialises in intensive insulin therapy, insulin pumps, and diabetes in pregnancy. Her academic interests include diabetic hypoglycaemia, islet transplantation, and diabetes and mental health.

Personal life
In 1998, Amiel married the British physician Sir George Alberti. This marriage brought three stepsons.

Selected works

References

1954 births
Living people
20th-century British medical doctors
21st-century British medical doctors
English women medical doctors
British medical researchers
Academics of King's College London
British diabetologists
Fellows of the Royal College of Physicians
Yale University faculty
Alumni of the University of London
Physicians of Guy's Hospital
People from Farnborough, London
20th-century women physicians
21st-century women physicians
20th-century English women
20th-century English people
21st-century English women
21st-century English people
Wives of knights